Paul Philippe Marie Joseph Bouttiau (10 September 1887 – 11 July 1916) was a Belgian footballer. He played in four matches for the Belgium national football team in 1910.

Personal life and death
Bouttiau was son of Paulin Philippe Anton Joseph Bouttiau and his wife Alice Marie Alexandrine (nee Delobbe). He married Laure Elise Semetier. He was living in Liege, Belgium when he was mobilised in the Belgian Army in World War I. He died while serving, exiled in Calais, on 11 July 1916 aged 28. He is buried at the Municipal Cemetery in Thy-le-Château, Belgium.

References

External links
 

1887 births
1916 deaths
Belgian footballers
Belgium international footballers
Association football defenders
Belgian military personnel killed in World War I
Belgian Army personnel of World War I